Eduard Viktorovich Kosolapov (27 March 1976 – 18 April 2014) was a Russian professional footballer.

Club career
He made his professional debut in the Russian Second Division in 1994 for FC Svetotekhnika Saransk. He played 3 games and scored 1 goal in the UEFA Intertoto Cup 1997 for FC Dynamo Moscow.

Death
He committed suicide by gunshot in April 2014.

Honours
Russian Premier League bronze: 1997.

References

1976 births
People from Ruzayevka
2014 deaths
Russian footballers
Association football midfielders
FC Dynamo Moscow players
FC Tom Tomsk players
Suicides by firearm in Russia
FC Mordovia Saransk players
Russian Premier League players
FC Zhemchuzhina Sochi players
FC Dynamo Bryansk players
2014 suicides
Sportspeople from Mordovia